Habeeb Okikiola (born 12 March 1994) popularly known as Portable or Dr Zeh is a Nigerian singer, rapper and songwriter.

Early life
Okikiola was born on 12 March 1994 in Abeokuta, Ogun State, Nigeria.

Career
Portable became famous after contributing to the song “ZaZoo Zehh” featuring Olamide and Nigerian dancer Poco Lee. During his early stage of fame, he became well known for calling out his business partners on social media for scamming him on business deals such as artist management and also on his Instagram handle where he mostly does all his controversial activities.

Discography

Selected singles

Award and nominations

References 

Living people
1994 births
Musicians from Lagos State
Nigerian male musicians
Nigerian male rappers
People from Ogun State